Events from the year 1675 in France

Incumbents
 Monarch – Louis XIV

Events
 5 January – Battle of Turckheim
 March 30 – The guild organisation Maîtresses couturières is founded in Paris. 
 April to September – Revolt of the papier timbré
 11 June – Treaty of Jaworów
 The Strasbourg Agreement, first international agreement to ban use of chemical weapons

Births

Full date missing
Claude Alexandre de Bonneval, military officer, also known as Humbaracı Ahmet Paşa, (died 1747)

Deaths

Full date missing
Jean Ballesdens, lawyer and editor (born 1595)
Gabriel de Rochechouart de Mortemart, nobleman (born 1600)
Gilles de Roberval, mathematician (born 1602)
Valentin Conrart, author (born 1603)
Pierre Perrin, poet and librettist (born c.1620)
Claude Lefèbvre, painter and engraver (born 1632)
Bernard Frénicle de Bessy, mathematician (born c.1605)

See also

References

1670s in France